A Dutch masculine given name and Low German surname that is a form of the Germanic Bernard (Bernhard). The name Bernhard means "Strong bear" or "Strong as a bear" (from Old German bero, "bear", and harti, "strong"). It is related to the Scandinavian name Bernt.

Surname
 Ben Berend (born 1995), American skier
 Charlotte Berend-Corinth (1880–1967), German painter 
 Elvira Berend (born 1965), Luxembourg chess grandmaster
 Fritz Berend (1889–1955), German English conductor
 Gudrun Berend, (1955–2011), German athlete
 Issachar Berend Lehmann (1661–1730), Court Jew 
 Iván Berend (born 1930), Hungarian historian
 Julius Berend Cohen (1859–1935), British chemist
 Nóra Berend, Hungarian historian

Given name
Berend Brummelman (born 1943), Dutch rower
Berend Tobia Boeyinga (1886–1969), Dutch architect
Berend Carp (1901–1966), Dutch Olympic sailor
Berend George Escher (1885–1967), Dutch geologist
Berend Wilhelm Feddersen (1832–1918), German physicist
Berend Hendriks (1918–1997), Dutch artist and lecturer 
Berend Kordes (1762–1823), German writer 
Berend McKenzie, Canadian actor and playwright 
Berend Schabus (born 1957), Austrian speed skater
Berend Strik (born 1960), Dutch visual artist 
Berend Jan Udink (1926–2016), Dutch politician
Berend Veneberg (born 1965), Dutch strongman
Berend-Jan van Voorst tot Voorst (born 1944), Dutch politician
Berend von Wetter-Rosenthal (1874–1940), Baltic-German politician
Berend Weijs (born 1988), Dutch basketball player

Other
 Berend is the Hungarian name for Berindan village, Odoreu Commune, Satu Mare County, Romania

See also
 Behrendt
 Barend (disambiguation)

Dutch masculine given names
Surnames from given names